Murexsul micra is a species of sea snail, a marine gastropod mollusk in the family Muricidae, the murex snails or rock snails.

Description

Distribution
This marine species occurs off New Caledonia.

References

 Houart, R., 2001. Ingensia gen. nov. and eleven new species of Muricidae from New Caledonia, Vanuatu, and Wallis and Futuna Islands. Mémoires du Muséum national d'Histoire naturelle 185: 243–269

External links
 MNHN, Paris; Murexsul micra (holotype)

Muricidae
Gastropods described in 2001